The 2016 "GDD CUP" International Challenger Guangzhou was a professional tennis tournament played on hard courts. It was the 5th edition of the tournament which was part of the 2016 ATP Challenger Tour. It took place in Guangzhou, China between 14 and 21 March 2016.

Singles main-draw entrants

Seeds

 1 Rankings are as of March 7, 2016

Other entrants
The following players received wildcards into the singles main draw:
  Altuğ Çelikbilek
  Wang Chuhan
  Bai Yan
  Li Zhe

The following player received entry into the singles main draw as a special exempt:
  Zhang Ze

The following players received entry from the qualifying draw:
  Lorenzo Sonego
  Maximilian Neuchrist 
  Marius Copil 
  Jimmy Wang

Champions

Singles

 Nikoloz Basilashvili def.  Lukáš Lacko, 6–1, 6–7(6–8), 7–5

Doubles

  Alexander Kudryavtsev /  Denys Molchanov def.  Sanchai Ratiwatana /  Sonchat Ratiwatana, 6–2, 6–2

External links

"GDD CUP" International Challenger Guangzhou
2016 in Chinese tennis
China International Guangzhou